Protected cruisers, a type of cruising warship of the late-19th century, gained their description because an  armoured deck offered protection for vital machine-spaces from fragments caused by  shells exploding above them. Protected cruisers resembled armored cruisers, which had in addition  a belt of armour along the sides.

Evolution

From the late 1850s, navies began to replace their fleets of wooden ships-of-the-line with armoured ironclad warships. However, the frigates and sloops which performed the missions of scouting, commerce raiding and trade protection remained unarmoured. For several decades, it proved difficult to design a ship which had a meaningful amount of effective armour but at the same time maintained the speed and range required of a "cruising warship". The first attempts to do so, large armored cruisers like , proved unsatisfactory, generally lacking enough speed for their cruiser role. They were, along with their foreign counterparts such as the French Alma class, more like second- or third-class battleships and were very much intended to fulfil this role on foreign stations where full-scale battleships could not be spared or properly supported.

The first protective decks

During the 1870s the increasing power of armour-piercing shells made armouring the sides of a warship more and more difficult, as very thick, heavy armour plates were required. Even if armour dominated the design of the ship, it was likely that the next generation of shells would be able to pierce such armour. This problem was even more poignant where the design of cruising warships was concerned, with their requirement for long endurance needing much of their displacement to be devoted to consumable supplies - even where very powerful & space-consuming high-speed machinery was not required - leaving very little weight available for armour protection. This meant that effective side belt armour would be almost impossible to provide for smaller ships.

The alternative was to leave the sides of the ship vulnerable, but to armour a deck just below the waterline. Since this deck would be struck only very obliquely by shells, it could be less thick and heavy than belt armour. The ship could be designed so that the engines, boilers and magazines were under the armoured deck, and with hopefully enough reserve buoyancy to keep the ship afloat even in the event of flooding resulting from damage above the protective deck. An armoured deck had actually been used for the first time in HMS Shannon, although she did rely principally on her vertical belt armour for defence: Her protective deck was only a partial one, extending from the forward armoured bulkhead of the citadel to the bow.

Early protected cruising ships

The Comus class were really designed for overseas service and were capable of only a  speed, not fast enough for fleet duties. The following Satellite and Calypso classes were similar in performance.

A more potent & versatile balance of attributes was struck with the four s. Ordered in 1880 as modified  dispatch vessels and re-rated as second-class cruisers before completion, these ships combined an amidships protective armoured deck with the size, lean form & high performance of HMS Mercury. They also featured a heavy & well-sited armament of modern breech-loading guns. Leander and her three sisters were successful and established a basis for future Royal Navy cruiser development, through the rest of the century and beyond.  Their general configuration was scaled up to the big First Class cruisers and down to the torpedo cruisers, whilst traces of the protected deck scheme can even be recognised in some sloops."

The breakthrough

In the case of the latter, the armoured deck was of sufficient thickness to defend against small-calibre guns capable of tracking such a difficult, fast target. This was very much the philosophy adopted by George Wightwick Rendel in his design of the so-called 'Rendel Cruisers' Arturo Prat, Chaoyong and Yangwei. By enlarging the flatiron gunboat concept, increasing engine power & thus speed, Rendel was able to produce a fast small vessel and still have enough tonnage to incorporate a very thin (quarter-inch thick) partial protective deck over the machinery. Still small and relatively weakly-built, these vessels were 'proto-protected cruisers' which served as the inspiration for a significantly larger ship; Esmeralda.

It would not defend against fire from heavy guns, but was designed to be adequate to defeat any gun of the day considered capable of hitting so fast a ship.

With her heavy emphasis on speed & firepower, Esmeralda set the tone for competitive cruiser designs into the early 20th Century, with 'Elswick cruisers' of a similar design being constructed for Italy, China, Japan, Argentina, Austria and the United States. Cruisers with armoured decks and no side armour - like Esmeralda - became known as "protected cruisers", and rapidly eclipsed the large & slow armoured cruisers during the 1880s and into the 1890s.

The French Navy adopted the protected-cruiser concept wholeheartedly in the 1880s. The Jeune École school of thought, which proposed a navy composed of fast cruisers for commerce raiding and torpedo boats for coastal defence, became particularly influential in France.

Abandonment of side armour

The Royal Navy remained equivocal about which protection scheme to use for cruisers until 1887. The large , begun in 1881 and finished in 1886, were built as armoured cruisers but were often referred to as protected cruisers due to the limited extent of their side armour - although what armour they had was admittedly very thick. Their primary role, as with the earlier Shannon and Nelsons, was still to function as small battleships on foreign stations, countering enemy stationnaire ironclads rather than chasing down swift commerce-raiding corsairs. While they carried a very thick & heavy armoured belt of great power of resistance that extended over the middle  of the ship's  length, the belt's upper edge was submerged at full load.

They were affected by a similar fault to the Imperieuse regarding their belt's submergence.

The sole major naval power to retain a preference for armoured cruisers into the 1890s was  Russia. The Imperial Russian Navy laid down four armoured cruisers and one protected cruiser during the late 1880s, all large ships with sails.

Elswick's influence on RN designs

Following the Leander class, the next small cruisers designed for the Royal Navy were the s of 1883. Derived from the previous class, these were also protected cruisers but with a full-length armoured deck for superior protection. The Merseys were born from a different tactical conception to their forebears and this was reflected in their armament arrangement. They were conceived as 'fleet torpedo cruisers' to carry out attacks on the enemy battle line and featured heavy guns fore &aft with excellent fields of fire. Despite public Admiralty criticism of Elswick designs, it is clear that the Mersey class was heavily influenced by the Italian 'torpedo ram cruiser' Giovanni Bausan, a design itself derived from Esmeralda. Thus, the British notion of the protected cruising warship was being shaped early on by the commercial export models coming out of Elswick. (For the following decade, practically any British cruiser which was seen to have eschewed very heavy firepower in favour of conservative design balance was subject to fierce public criticism, and this period coincided somewhat unfortunately with Sir William White's tenure as DNC.)

The protected cruiser remained a popular & economical type, rather stable in terms of its characteristics, right throughout the 1890s and into the early 1900s. During this period, protected cruiser designs of second- to third-class grew slowly in size, seeing few major changes to the common balance of design features. Perhaps the most significant paradigm shift came with the universal adoption of quick-firing guns by the world's navies in the middle of the 1890s; suddenly small & medium cruisers saw a swift increase in their fighting power for a slight reduction in gun calibre, yielding a very economical balance of attributes. This kept the protected cruiser competitive for a further decade.

Eclipse of the type

By 1910, steel armour had increased in quality, being lighter & stronger than before thanks to metallurgical advances, and  steam-turbine engines, lighter and more powerful than previous  reciprocating engines, were in general use. This gave rise to a new class of cruising warship, the "light armoured cruisers" which featured a side armoured belt (topped by a flat armoured deck) amidships and sloped armoured decks at the ends, instead of the single full-length curved deck of the older ships. With the introduction of  Oil-fired boilers, more effective at generating a constant steam pressure to get the best performance from the turbine engines, side bunkers of coal disappeared from ships and this change removed the protection they had afforded, making the shift to side armour a practical choice.

The majority of pre-existing protected cruisers - products of the Victorian-era design generation - had now become obsolete: With their by-now old and worn engines degrading their already-eclipsed performance by this point; their older models of lower-velocity guns able to shoot accurately to a shorter distance than newer equivalent ships, in a period where long-range fire control was a rapidly-developing discipline with technology to match; and finally - most critically - being less well protected than the new generation of side-armoured ships. From this point on, practically no more protected cruisers would be built for the world's navies.

Protected cruisers in service

Austria-Hungary

The Austro-Hungarian Navy built and operated three classes of protected cruisers.

Britain

The Royal Navy rated cruisers as first, second and third class between the late 1880s and 1905, and built large numbers of them for trade protection requirements. For most of this time these cruisers were built with a "protected", rather than armoured, scheme of protection for their hulls. First-class protected cruisers were as large and as well-armed as armoured cruisers, and were built as an alternative to the large first-class armoured cruiser from the late 1880s till 1898. Second-class protected cruisers were smaller, displacing  and were of value both in trade protection duties and scouting for the fleet. Third-class cruisers were smaller, lacked a watertight double bottom, and were intended primarily for trade protection duties, though a few small cruisers were built for fleet scout roles or as "torpedo" cruisers during the "protected" era.

The introduction of Krupp armour in six-inch thickness rendered the "armoured" protection scheme more effective for the largest first class cruisers, and no large first class protected cruisers were built after 1898. There was a general hiatus in British cruiser production after this time, apart from a few classes of small, fast scout cruisers for fleet duties. When the Royal Navy began building larger cruisers (less than ) again around 1910, they used a mix of armoured decks and/or armoured belts for protection, depending on class. These modern, turbine-powered cruisers are properly classified as light cruisers.

France

Germany

The Navy completed only two additional classes of protected cruisers, comprising six more ships: the unique , and the five  ships. The type then was superseded by the armored cruiser at the turn of the century, the first of which being . All of these ships tended to incorporate design elements from their foreign contemporaries, though the Victoria Louise class more closely resembled German battleships of the period, which carried lighter main guns and a greater number of secondary guns.

These ships were employed as fleet scouts and colonial cruisers. During a deployment to American waters in 1902,  participated in the Venezuelan crisis of 1902–1903, where she bombarded Fort San Carlos. Long since obsolete by the outbreak of World War I, the five Victoria Louise-class vessels briefly served as training ships in the Baltic but were withdrawn by the end of 1914 for secondary duties. Kaiserin Augusta and the two Irene-class cruisers similarly served in reduced capacities for the duration of the war. All eight ships were broken up for scrap following Germany's defeat.

Italy

The Italian Regia Marina (Royal Navy) ordered twenty protected cruisers between the 1880s and 1910s. Subsequent cruisers were more traditional designs, and were instead intended for reconnaissance and colonial duties.

Most of these ships saw action during the Italo-Turkish War of 1911–1912, where several of them supported Italian troops fighting in Libya, and another group operated in the Red Sea. There, the cruiser  and two destroyers sank or destroyed seven Ottoman gunboats in the Battle of Kunfuda Bay in January 1912. Most of the earlier cruisers were obsolescent by the outbreak of World War I, and so had either been sold for scrap or reduced to subsidiary roles. The most modern vessels, including Quarto and the Nino Bixio class, saw limited action in the Adriatic Sea after Italy entered the war in 1915.

Netherlands

The Royal Netherlands Navy built several protected cruisers between 1880 and 1900. The first protected cruiser was launched in 1890 and called . It was a small cruiser with a heavy main gun; four years later a larger and more heavily armed protected cruiser was commissioned, which was called . The Holland-class cruisers were commissioned between 1898 and 1901, and featured, besides other armaments, two 15 cm SK L/40 single naval guns.

The Dutch protected cruisers have played a role in several international events. For example, during the Boxer Rebellion two protected cruisers ( and Koningin Wilhelmina der Nederlanden) were sent to Shanghai to protect European citizens and defend Dutch interests.

Russia

The Imperial Russian Navy operated a series of protected cruisers classes (Armored deck cruiser).

Spain

United States

A numbered series of cruisers began with Newark (Cruiser No. 1), although Charleston (Cruiser No. 2) was the first to be launched, in July 1888, and ending with another Charleston, Cruiser No. 22, launched in 1904.

The reclassification of 17 July 1920 put an end to the U.S. usage of the term "protected cruiser", the existing ships were classified as light or heavy cruisers with new numbers, depending on their level of armor.

Surviving examples
A few protected cruisers have survived as museum ships, while others were used as breakwaters, some of which can still be seen today.
  – St Petersburg, Russia
  – Philadelphia, Pennsylvania
  replica is on display in Dandong, China
 Bow section and bridge of  – La Spezia, Italy
Bow section of HMS Vindictive is on display at Ostend, Belgium
The hulk of USS Charleston serves as a breakwater in Kelsey Bay, on the north coast of Vancouver Island.

See also 

 Battlecruiser
 Unprotected cruiser

Footnotes

References 
 Beeler, John, Birth of the Battleship: British Capital Ship Design 1870–1881. Caxton, London, 2003.

Further reading

External links

Ship types